The 1922 Penn State Nittany Lions football team represented the Pennsylvania State University in the 1922 college football season. The team was coached by Hugo Bezdek and played its home games in New Beaver Field in State College, Pennsylvania.

The Lions were invited to the Rose Bowl on New Year's Day, the first edition of the bowl game played in the current stadium.

Schedule

References

Penn State
Penn State Nittany Lions football seasons
Penn State Nittany Lions football